Paul Pescador (born in 1983) is a contemporary artist who works in film, photography, and performance. Pescador was born in Indio, CA, and now lives and works in Los Angeles, CA. Pescador received their B.A. in 2005 from the University of Southern California and their M.F.A. in 2012 from the University of California Irvine. Pescador is best known for their playful photographic use of color and composition, and for their short film narratives that follow both personal experience and fiction. Pescador has shown widely in Los Angeles and California, including exhibitions at the University of California Los Angeles, the REDCAT theater at California Institute for the Arts, and University of California Berkeley. Their films have screened at Machine Project, Human Resources, Echo Park Film Center in Los Angeles, and Durham Studio Theater at UC Berkeley. Pescador also works in curation and has organized shows at the Hammer Museum and The Pit in Los Angeles. In 2015 Pescador was the grant recipient of the California Community Foundation's Emerging Category.

References

Living people
1983 births
Artists from Los Angeles
University of Southern California alumni
University of California, Irvine alumni
People from San Bernardino County, California
American contemporary artists
People from Indio, California